ÄWPK – Älywapaa palokunta is a Finnish sketch television series. It first aired on Finnish TV in 1984 and last aired in 1985.

Cast
 Heikki Kinnunen
 Leo Lastumäki
 Titta Jokinen
 Kristiina Elstelä
 Maija-Leena Soinne
 Aake Kalliala

See also
List of Finnish television series
Onks' Viljoo näkyny?

External links
 

Finnish television sketch shows
1984 Finnish television series debuts
1985 Finnish television series endings
1980s Finnish television series
MTV3 original programming